William Mowatt (29 May 1885 – 30 June 1943) was a New Zealand cricketer. He played in one first-class match for Wellington in 1903/04.

See also
 List of Wellington representative cricketers

References

1885 births
1943 deaths
New Zealand cricketers
Wellington cricketers
People from Port Chalmers